Julius Brents (born January 18, 2000) is an American football cornerback. He played college football at Iowa and Kansas State.

High school career
Brents attended Warren Central High School in Warren Township, Marion County, Indiana. He committed to the University of Iowa to play college football.

College career
Brents played at Iowa from 2018 to 2020. He played in 18 games with five starts and had 17 tackles and one interception. Prior to the 2021 season he transferred to Kansas State University. In two years at Kansas State, he started 27 games and recorded 94 tackles and five interceptions.

References

External links
Kansas State Wildcats bio
Iowa Hawkeyes bio

Living people
Players of American football from Indiana
American football cornerbacks
Iowa Hawkeyes football players
Kansas State Wildcats football players
2000 births